Adrara may refer to the following places in the province of Bergamo, Italy:

Adrara San Martino
Adrara San Rocco